The Savannah sparrow (Passerculus sandwichensis) is a small New World sparrow. It was the only member of the genus Passerculus and is typically the only widely accepted member. Comparison of mtDNA NADH dehydrogenase subunit 2 and 3 sequences indicates that the Ipswich sparrow, formerly usually considered a valid species (as Passerculus princeps), is a well-marked subspecies of the Savannah sparrow, whereas the southwestern large-billed sparrow should be recognized as a distinct species (Passerculus rostratus).

The species name sandwichensis is Latin, of place, Sandwich, Unalaska, or Aleutians area, from which came the first subspecies, Aleutian Savannah sparrow, to be described. The common name honors Savannah, Georgia where Alexander Wilson discovered the species in 1811.

Distribution
This passerine bird breeds in Alaska, Canada, northern, central and Pacific coastal United States, Mexico and Guatemala. The Pacific and Mexican breeders are resident, but other populations are migratory, wintering from the southern United States across Central America and the Caribbean to northern South America. It is a very rare vagrant to western Europe.

Description

This species has a typically sparrow-like dark-streaked brown back, and whitish underparts with brown or blackish breast and flank streaking. It has whitish crown and supercilium stripes, sometimes with some yellow (more often near the beak). The cheeks are brown and the throat white. The flight feathers are blackish-brown with light brown or white border. The eyes are dark. The feet and legs are horn-colored, as is the lower part of the bill, with the upper part being dark grey.

The Savannah sparrow is a very variable species, with numerous subspecies, several of which have been split as separate species at various times. The different forms vary principally in the darkness of the plumage. The variation generally follows Gloger's rule, with Alaskan and interior races the palest, and southwestern coastal forms the darkest. There are some exceptions, though, most conspicuously in some island populations that presumably were strongly affected by founder effects. The general pattern of variation has a fairly clear divide, southwest of which the birds become notably darker; this agrees quite well with the limit between P. sandwichensis and P. (s.) rostratus. Savannah sparrows show some variation in size across subspecies. In the nominate subspecies, the body weight averages .

The Savannah sparrows proper (see below) are very similar, and migrant birds can not usually be related to a breeding population with certainty. The resident or partially migratory subspecies are well distinguishable by size and, particularly between groups, coloration.

Behavior

These birds forage on the ground or in low bushes; particularly in winter they are also found in grazed low-growth grassland. They mainly eat seeds, but also eat insects in the breeding season. They are typically encountered as pairs or family groups in the breeding season, and assemble in flocks for the winter migration. The flight call is a thin seep. Sensu lato, the Savannah sparrow is considered a threatened species by the IUCN. The song is mixture of chirps and trills.

Systematics

Seventeen subspecies (including the large-billed sparrows) are currently recognized, though many are only described from wintering birds and much of the variation seems to be clinal. Four additional subspecies are no longer generally accepted. The complex is usually divided into several groups:

Savannah sparrows proper

All are migratory; wintering ranges overlap widely.
 P. s. labradorius, breeds in Newfoundland, Labrador, and N Quebec
 P. s. oblitus, breeds in north Ontario and Manitoba
 P. s. savanna (eastern Savannah sparrow), breeds in the northeast US and adjacent Canada (includes P. s. mediogriseus)
 P. s. sandwichensis (Aleutian Savannah sparrow), breeds on the Aleutian Islands and west Alaskan Peninsula
 P. s. anthinus, breeds in the remainder of Alaska, south and east to central British Columbia and north of the Great Plains to Manitoba
 P. s. brooksi (dwarf Savannah sparrow), breeds in southernmost British Columbia to northernmost California
 P. s. alaudinus, breeds in coastal northern and central California
 P. s. nevadensis, breeds in the northern Great Plains and the Great Basin
 P. s. brunnescens, breeds from central Mexico south to Guatemala (includes P. s. rufofuscus)

P. s. wetmorei is a doubtful subspecies that may breed in the mountains of Guatemala. It is known from only five specimens, collected June 11–17, 1897, in Huehuetenango Department.

Ipswich sparrow
Some post-breeding dispersal. Formerly considered a distinct species.
 P. s. princeps, breeds almost exclusively on Sable Island
The Ipswich sparrow is somewhat larger and paler in color than other eastern Savannah sparrows. The breast streaks are narrower and pale brown. Some birds overwinter on the island; others migrate south along the Atlantic coast, usually departing later and returning sooner than mainland birds. Some birds interbreed with P. s. savanna in Nova Scotia. These birds frequently raise three broods in a year. This bird was first observed in winter on the dunes near the town of Ipswich, Massachusetts.

Large-billed sparrows
The large-billed sparrows proper are two dark, large and strong-billed subspecies:
 Passerculus rostratus/sandwichensis rostratus, which breed on the Gulf Coast of northeast Baja California and northwest Sonora (some post-breeding dispersal).
 P. r./s. atratus, resident on the coast of central Sonora to central Sinaloa (resident)

The Belding's (Savannah/large-billed) sparrows are all-year residents of salt marshes of the Californian Pacific coast. They are dark, rufous, and have rather long but not very hefty bills.
 P. r./s. beldingi, resident on the Pacific coast from Morro Bay, California, to El Rosario, Baja California (includes P. r./s. bryanti)
 P. r./s. anulus, resident around Sebastián Vizcaíno Bay, Baja California
 P. r./s. guttatus, resident around San Ignacio Lagoon
 P. r./s. magdalenae, resident around Magdalena Bay

The San Benito (Savannah/large-billed) sparrow is a resident bird of the Islas San Benito off Baja California; a stray bird was observed on Cedros Island on April 21, 1906.
 P. r./s. sanctorum
This is a large-bodied and large-billed subspecies, similar to rostratus. They utilize different habitat and their breeding season does not seem to coincide with that of Belding's sparrows. However, their bill size is due to convergent evolution and their habitat choice simply to the lack of alternatives on their barren island home; altogether, it appears to be a fairly recent offshoot from the Belding's sparrows group. It appears as distinct evolutionarily from these as does the Ipswich sparrow from the Savannah sparrow proper group, only that there seems to have been more gene flow and/or a larger founder population in the case of the latter.

Gallery

Notes

References

Further reading

External links

 Government of Canada Species at Risk Public Registry – Savannah sparrow
Savannah sparrow species account – Cornell Lab of Ornithology
Savannah sparrow - Passerculus sandwichensis – USGS Patuxent Bird Identification InfoCenter
 
 
 

savannah sparrow
American sparrows
Birds of North America
savannah sparrow
savannah sparrow